Eurydoxa mesoclasta is a species of moth of the family Tortricidae. It is found in the eastern Himalayas and Sikkim, India.

The wingspan is 41–47 mm. The forewings are dark purple fuscous, covered with rows of small whitish spots. The hindwings are whitish with a fuscous blotch.

References

Moths described in 1908
Ceracini